Zlata may refer to:

 Zlata, female given name of South Slavic origin
 Zlata (Râul Mare), a river in Hunedoara County, Romania
 Zlatá, Czech Republic
 Zlata, Romanian village

See also 

 Zlatan
 Zlatar (disambiguation)